Gordon Bell Pianos is a piano retailer based on Rosemount Viaduct in Aberdeen. 

The company specialises in tuning, sales, event hire, restoration and removals of pianos. Bell was responsible for the pianos of Aberdeen Performing Arts at the Music Hall and HM Theatre. The company is run by Gordon Bell (b. 1976) ). Bell was granted a Royal Warrant of Appointment for piano tuning and servicing by Queen Elizabeth II in 2009. They are responsible for four pianos on Balmoral Castle, which include a Steinway concert grand piano and a Broadwood grand piano, given at the Silver Jubilee of 1977.

References

External links
 Homepage of Gordon Bell Pianos
 The Press & Journal | Achievement of note for Aberdeen firm
 The Telegraph | Royal Warrant holders: the seal of approval

British Royal Warrant holders
Companies based in Aberdeen
Musical instrument retailers
Retail companies of Scotland
String instrument organizations